Tephritis mesopotamica is a species of tephritid or fruit flies in the genus Tephritis of the family Tephritidae.

Distribution
Iraq.

References

Tephritinae
Insects described in 2000
Diptera of Asia